Inang Yaya (Mother Nanny) is a 2006 film directed by Pablo Biglang-awa and Veronica Velasco and stars Maricel Soriano as Norma, a nanny who has to choose between Ruby (Tala Santos, her daughter) or Louise (Erika Oreta, the girl who she takes care of). The film won Best Film and Best Performance, awards given by the Young Critics Circle.

Plot
Norma (Maricel Soriano) straddles between being a mother to Ruby (Tala Santos) and being a nanny to her employer's daughter, Louise (Erika Oreta). Norma left her daughter in the province to be a nanny to another person's daughter. An emergency forces Norma to bring Ruby with her to Manila and her employer is kind enough to accept Ruby in the household. However, Louise (Erika Oreta), the daughter of Norma's employer, competes with Ruby for Norma's affection. Now, Norma has to balance her love and attention for the two special people in her life: her daughter and her ward.

Casts
Maricel Soriano as Norma
Erika Oreta as Louise
Tala Santos as Ruby
Sunshine Cruz as May
Zoren Legaspi as Noel
Liza Lorena as Lola Toots
Marita Zobel as Lola Tersing
Matthew Mendoza as Mon
Kalila Aguilos as Luz 
JM Reyes as Carlo 
Jessu Trinidad as Cocoy
Erica Dehesa as Alexa
Julia Buencamino as Margarita
Janneke Agustin as Nana
Roence Santos as Tess

References

External links

2006 drama films
2006 films
2000s Tagalog-language films
Films about nannies
Philippine drama films
Films directed by Veronica Velasco